Voltaire Molesworth (29 December 1889 – 5 November 1934) was an Australian politician.

Born in Balmain to seaman James Molesworth and Elizabeth Ellen Vibert, his family travelled to the socialist New Australia settlement in Paraguay when he was an infant. He was a commercial traveller in Sydney before working with the Cumberland Times around 1911. He continued in journalism and married Ivy Vick in 1916, with whom he had three children. A member of the Labor Party, he was secretary of the Homebush branch, the Granville state electorate council and the Nepean federal electorate council. In 1915 he was elected to the district committee of the Australian Journalists Association, of which he was treasurer (1917–19) and president (1919–21). Molesworth was elected to the New South Wales Legislative Assembly in 1920 as a Labor member for Cumberland, serving until 1925, when he became chief of staff of the Times, later becoming editor from 1927 to 1929. In 1925 he left the Labor Party and later joined the Nationalist Party. He was appointed to the New South Wales Legislative Council in 1932 as a member of the United Australia Party and served until 1934. Molesworth died in Sydney.

References

1890 births
1934 deaths
United Australia Party members of the Parliament of New South Wales
Members of the New South Wales Legislative Assembly
Members of the New South Wales Legislative Council
Politicians from Sydney
Australian Labor Party members of the Parliament of New South Wales
20th-century Australian politicians
20th-century Australian journalists